Dime Store Prophets was a Christian modern rock band which was active during the mid- to late-1990s.

Musical career
Singer/Songwriter Justin Stevens and Engineer/Producer/Songwriter Masaki Liu originally formed the band  Radiation Ranch, a "roots" rock band with strong rockabilly influences.  With Justin writing the lyrics, melodies and most chord progressions, Masaki provided the sound with an old Telecaster guitar. With the addition of Phil Meads on drums and Sam Hernandez on bass in 1993, the band changed its name to Dime Store Prophets. The name was taken from a lyric of a "Radiation Ranch" song called "Mercy Me" (the lyric was changed before Dime Store Prophets recorded the song on the first edition of their first cd).

Dime Store Prophets often opened for secular acts such as Joan Jett, Mudhoney, and Better Than Ezra.

Dime Store Prophets disbanded some time in or before 1999, when lead singer Justin Stevens (aka Justin Dillon) formed his own band. It first took the form of the Justin Dillon Combo, then, Justin Dillon and the Brilliantines, and finally, the current Tremolo.

Discography

References

Christian rock groups from California
Performers of contemporary Christian music
Musical groups established in 1993
1993 establishments in California